Mighty Mike may refer to:

 A re-release of the computer game Power Pete
Michael van Gerwen, darts player
Mighty Mike McGee, slam poet
Mike Anchondo, boxer
Mike Arnaoutis, boxer
Mike Van Sant, drag racer
Mike Cuozzo, saxophonist
"Mighty Mike C", a member of the Fearless Four
Mighty Mike (TV series), a French CGI-animated series